Lust Connection is a 2005 American erotic thriller film directed by Jim Wynorski.

Cast
Glori-Anne Gilbert as Jenny / Susan
Frank Harper as Rick
Jay Richardson as Detective Blake

References

External links

Lust Connection at Letterbox DVD
Review at DVD Talk

2005 films
Films directed by Jim Wynorski
American erotic thriller films
2000s erotic thriller films
2000s English-language films
2000s American films